Giulietta De Riso (1896–1988) was an Italian stage and film actress.

Selected filmography
 The Betrothed (1914)
 La moglie del dottore (1916)
 Crevalcore (1917)
 Cardinal Lambertini (1934)
 Abandonment (1940)
 Finalmente sì (1944)

References

Bibliography
 Goble, Alan. The Complete Index to Literary Sources in Film. Walter de Gruyter, 1999.

External links

1896 births
1988 deaths
Italian film actresses
Italian stage actresses
People from İzmir
Italian expatriates in the Ottoman Empire